John "Jack" Woods (q4 1896 – 1969) was an English professional footballer who played as a centre forward in the Football League for Halifax Town and in non-League football for Stalybridge Celtic and York City.

Jack's sister Alice was an elite sprinter and played football for Dick, Kerr Ladies. While playing for Halifax Town he helped to coach the St Helens Ladies team which gave Alice and Lily Parr their first experiences of organised football.

References

1896 births
Association football forwards
Date of death unknown
English Football League players
English footballers
Footballers from St Helens, Merseyside
Halifax Town A.F.C. players
Midland Football League players
Stalybridge Celtic F.C. players
York City F.C. players